Plains is a town and the county seat of Yoakum County of western Texas, United States, particularly the south (inner) half of the panhandle's plains. The city's population was 1,481 at the 2010 census. Plains in the Texas High Plains Wine country.

Geography

Plains is located at  (33.190251, –102.827578).

According to the United States Census Bureau, the town has a total area of 1.0 square miles (2.6 km), all of it land.

Climate

According to the Köppen climate classification system, Plains has a semiarid climate, BSk on climate maps.

Demographics

2020 census

As of the 2020 United States census, there were 1,355 people, 428 households, and 346 families residing in the town.

2000 census
At the 2000 census, there were 1,450 people, 485 households, and 390 families living in the town.  The population density was 1,465.6 people per square mile (565.5/km). There were 569 housing units at an average density of 575.1 per square mile (221.9/km).  The racial makeup of the town was 69.66% White, 0.76% Native American, 0.07% Asian, 0.07% Pacific Islander, 27.79% from other races, and 1.66% from two or more races. Hispanic or Latino of any race were 53.03% of the population.

Of the 485 households 42.3% had children under the age of 18 living with them, 68.0% were married couples living together, 8.9% had a female householder with no husband present, and 19.4% were non-families. 17.1% of households were one person and 8.7% were one person aged 65 or older.  The average household size was 2.98 and the average family size was 3.37.

The age distribution was 32.6% under the age of 18, 8.1% from 18 to 24, 27.4% from 25 to 44, 20.7% from 45 to 64, and 11.2% 65 or older.  The median age was 34 years. For every 100 females, there were 97.0 males.  For every 100 females age 18 and over, there were 91.0 males.

The median household income was $32,188 and the median family income  was $36,250. Males had a median income of $27,188 versus $21,042 for females. The per capita income for the town was $14,624.  About 17.2% of families and 20.2% of the population were below the poverty line, including 28.9% of those under age 18 and 23.5% of those age 65 or over.

Education
The Town of Plains is served by the Plains Independent School District.

Notable people

 Clyde "Bulldog" Turner, inducted into the Professional Football Hall of Fame for the Chicago Bears

References

External links

 Plains in the Handbook of Texas Online

Towns in Yoakum County, Texas
Towns in Texas
County seats in Texas